Rudolf Georg Binding (13 August 1867 – 4 August 1938) was a German writer.

He was born in Basel, Switzerland, and died in Starnberg. He studied medicine and law before joining the Hussars. On the outbreak of the First World War, Binding, who was forty-six years old, became commander of a squadron of dragoons. Except for a four-month period in Galicia in 1916, Binding spent the whole of the war on the Western Front.

Binding's diary and letters, A Fatalist at War, was published in 1927. His collected war poems, stories and recollections were not published until after his death in 1938.

Binding was never a member of the National Socialist Party and publicly dissociated himself from one of its actions; but his relationship to it was ambiguous, for he saw it at times as an aspect of national revival.

In 1928 he won a silver medal in the art competitions of the Olympic Games for his "Reitvorschrift für eine Geliebte" ("Rider's Instructions to his Lover").

From 1933 his private secretary and English interpreter was German Jew Elisabeth Jungmann. Binding had hoped to marry Jungmann but was prevented from doing so by the Nuremberg Laws. She became the second wife of Sir Max Beerbohm in 1956.

In October 1933 Binding signed the Gelöbnis treuester Gefolgschaft declaring loyalty and support to Adolf Hitler.

He was on friendly terms with the English writer A.P. Herbert, to whom he was introduced by Wilhelmine Arnold-Baker. They found that they had been within yards of each other in opposite trenches during the war.

Publications

By Rudolf Binding
 Aus dem Kriege. Rütten & Loening, Frankfurt-am-Main 1925; translated into English as A Fatalist at War, Ian F. D. Morrow, tr., Allen & Unwin, London 1929 and Houghton Mifflin Company, Boston and New York 1929
 Das grosse Rudolf-G.-Binding-Buch. Eine Auswahl aus dem Werk. Bertelsmann, München 1979 
 Der Opfergang. Eine Novelle. (53. edition, Insel, Frankfurt am Main 1993 )

About Rudolf Binding
 Traude Stenner: Rudolf G. Binding. Leben und Werk. Potsdam: Rütten & Loening. 1938.
 Anton Mayer: Der Göttergleiche. Erinnerungen an Rudolf G. Binding. Potsdam: Rütten & Loening. 1939.
 Heinz Millotat: Rudolf G. Bindings erzählerisches Werk. Würzburg-Aumühle: Triltsch. 1939.
 Roger L. Cole: The Ethical Foundations of Rudolf Binding's 'Gentleman'-Concept. The Hague and others: Mouton. 1966. (= Studies in German literature; 7)
 Bernhard Martin: Dichtung und Ideologie. Völkisch-nationales Denken im Werk Rudolf Georg Bindings. Frankfurt am Main and others: Peter Lang. 1986. (= Europäische Hochschulschriften; Reihe 1; Deutsche Sprache und Literatur; 950) 
 Reitvorschrift für eine Geliebte (New edition: Olms, Hildesheim and others, 1995 )
 Kirstin M. Howard: The concept of honour in the context of the World War One. Accounts of Walter Flex, Rudolf G. Binding and Ernst Jünger. Dunedin, New Zealand: Univ. of Otago, Dissertation, 1996.

Trivia
Binding was introduced to the English poet Sir Herbert Read by Wilhelmine Arnold-Baker. They discovered that they must have been posted within yards of each other on opposite sides of the trenches of the Western Front.

References

External links
 

1867 births
1938 deaths
Writers from Basel-Stadt
German people of Swiss descent
German Army personnel of World War I
20th-century German male writers
German World War I poets
German male poets
20th-century diarists
Medalists at the 1928 Summer Olympics
Olympic competitors in art competitions
Olympic silver medalists in art competitions